RefDB may refer to:

RefDB, a client/server reference database and bibliography tool for markup languages like SGML, XML, and LaTeX.
RefDB (chemistry), the Re-referenced Protein Chemical shift Database.